Mount Parrish is a  mountain summit located in Alberta, Canada.

Description

Mount Parrish is situated eight kilometers southwest of the town of Coleman in the Crowsnest Pass area and can be seen from Highway 3, the Crowsnest Highway. It is part of the Flathead Range which is a subset of the Canadian Rockies. The peak is set one kilometer east of the Continental Divide, in Castle Wildland Provincial Park. Precipitation runoff from the mountain drains into tributaries of the nearby Crowsnest River. Topographic relief is significant as the summit rises 1,190 meters (3,900 feet) above the river in 5 kilometers (3.1 miles).

History

Mount Parrish is named after Sherman Parrish, an early settler in the Crowsnest Pass area in 1898. He homesteaded at the foot of this mountain and raised cattle. The mountain's toponym was officially adopted March 15, 1962, by the Geographical Names Board of Canada.

On January 19, 1946, a Royal Canadian Air Force DC-3 struck Mount Ptolemy and crashed into the North York Creek valley below Mount Parrish. All seven crewmembers perished in the accident. Some wreckage of the aircraft is still present.

Geology
Mount Parrish is composed of limestone which is a sedimentary rock laid down during the Precambrian to Jurassic periods. Formed in shallow seas, this sedimentary rock was pushed east and over the top of younger Cretaceous period rock during the Laramide orogeny.

Climate
Based on the Köppen climate classification, Mount Parrish has an alpine subarctic climate with cold, snowy winters, and mild summers. Winter temperatures can drop below −20 °C with wind chill factors below −30 °C.

Gallery

See also
Geology of Alberta
Geography of Alberta

References

External links
 Mount Parrish: weather forecast

Two-thousanders of Alberta
Canadian Rockies
Crowsnest Pass, Alberta